General elections were held in Barbados on 9 September 1971. Amendments to the electoral system saw the two-member constituencies previously used replaced by single-member first-past-the-post constituencies. This was also the first election in modern Barbadian history to be contested by only two political parties, not including two independent candidates.

The result was a victory for the Democratic Labour Party, which won 18 of the 24 seats. Despite achieving a larger increase in vote share than its opponent, the Barbados Labour Party lost two seats and its leader, Harold Bernard St. John, was defeated in his constituency of Christ Church South Central. Voter turnout was 81.6%, the highest in the country's history.

Results

Further reading

References 

Barbados
General
Elections in Barbados
Barbados